Nadeem Farooq Paracha, also known as NFP, is a Pakistani journalist, author, cultural critic, satirist and historian. He is a columnist for Pakistan's largest English-language daily Dawn.

Career

He is the author of seven books on the social and political history of Pakistan: The Pakistan Anti-Hero, End of the Past, Points of Entry, Muslim Modernism: A Case For Naya Pakistan, and Soul Rivals.
His sixth book The Reluctant Republic: The Ethos & Mythos of Pakistan, was published in November 2021.
On August 11, 2022 Paracha’s seventh book  For Faith, State and the Soul was launched. The book is a history of popular culture in Pakistan. It is being considered as Paracha’s most ambitious work.

Paracha is also a Research Scholar and Reagan-Fascell Fellow at the International Forum for Democratic Studies in Washington DC. and a consultant for Adcom Leo Burnett Worldwide.

Paracha graduated from the Karachi Grammar School in 1983.  He then joined a state-owned college in Karachi where he became a radical Marxist student leader. After college he became a journalist and was often considered to be a socialist. However, over the last decade he has often described himself as a Muslim modernist, a progressive Pakistani nationalist, and a democrat. He is also a harsh critic of postmodernism and is staunchly against the mixing of religion with politics.

Books
End of the past : An immediate eyewitness history of a troubled nation, Lahore : Vanguard Books, 2016, 234 p.
The Pakistan Anti-Hero : History of Pakistani nationalism through the lives of iconoclasts, Lahore : Vanguard Books, 2017, 396 p.
Points of Entry : Encounters at the origin-sites of Pakistan, Chennai : Tranquebar, 2018, 160 p.
Muslim modernism : A case for Naya Pakistan, Lahore : Vanguard Books, 2019, 162 p.
Soul Rivals : State, Militant and Pop Sufism in Pakistan, Chennai : Tranquebar, 2020, 128 p.
The Reluctant Republic: Ethos And Mythos Of Pakistan, Lahore: Vanguard Books, 2021, 147 p.
For Faith, State and the Soul: A History of Popular Culture in Pakistan, Karachi: Markings, 2022, 204 p.

References

Living people
1967 births
Pakistani male journalists
Pakistani non-fiction writers
Dawn (newspaper) people
Journalists from Karachi
Pakistani music critics
Pakistani columnists
St. Patrick's High School, Karachi alumni
Karachi Grammar School alumni
Critics of postmodernism
Pakistani Marxists
Pakistani secularists
21st-century Pakistani historians
Pakistani satirists